Pteraclis is a genus of fish in the family Bramidae, the pomfrets. They are known commonly as fanfishes. The three species are distributed throughout the oceans of the world.

Species
Species include:
 Pteraclis aesticola (D. S. Jordan & Snyder, 1901) – Pacific fanfish
 Pteraclis carolinus Valenciennes, 1833 – fanfish
 Pteraclis velifera (Pallas, 1770) – spotted fanfish

References

Bramidae